The 2010 FC Anzhi Makhachkala season was the 1st season that the club played in the Russian Premier League, the highest tier of football in Russia since their relegation in 2002. They finished 11th in the league and also took part in the 2010–11 Russian Cup, exiting at the round of 16 stage.

Season events
On 25 January, Mahir Shukurov signed for Anzhi Makhachkala.

On 2 March, Otar Martsvaladze moved to Volga Nizhny Novgorod on loan for the season.

On 18 March, Omari Tetradze resigned as manager,  with Gadzhi Gadzhiyev being appointed as their new manager on 18 April.

On 1 August, Oskars Kļava signed for Anzhi Makhachkala from Liepājas Metalurgs.

Squad

Out on loan

Transfers

In

Loans in

Out

Loans out

Released

Competitions

Premier League

Results summary

Results by round

Results

League table

Russian Cup

Round 16 took place during the 2011–12 season.

Squad statistics

Appearances and goals

|-
|colspan="14"|Players away from the club on loan:

|-
|colspan="14"|Players who appeared for Anzhi Makhachkala no longer at the club:

|}

Goal scorers

Clean sheets

Disciplinary record

References

2010
Anzhi Makhachkala